Kitsilano Secondary School is a public secondary school in the Kitsilano neighbourhood of Vancouver, British Columbia, Canada. The school has several district programs including French immersion and on-site pre-employment. Advanced Placement courses are also offered.

The school
The first students selected royal blue and gold as the school colours, based on those at Aberdeen University (the Alma Mater of one of their teachers); the first Latin classes chose "Fiat Lux" (Let there be light) as the school motto. The original school crest was designed by Mr. S. P. Judge, the first art teacher at Kitsilano, and although the crest has undergone some slight changes over the decades, it still proudly displays the colours and motto.

The school is particularly well known for the numerous television and film productions which have been filmed there. Disturbing Behavior, Big Bully, Anything for Love, The Santa Claus 2, 21 Jump Street, and Party of Five used Kitsilano as a filming location. The school also counts a number of former alumni who went on to careers in film and television, notably Ryan Reynolds and Joshua Jackson.

The school song "Hail Kitsilano"  was composed in 1936 by Mr. Ivor Parfitt.

The school's mission statement is: 
"Kitsilano
A place where you find
Safety, energy, respect
Passion for Learning!
Fiat Lux!"

The main foyer is home to a portrait of Chief August Jack Khahtsahlano, the school's namesake. The auditorium houses a Tanu totem pole, carved by Don Yeomans in 1986 in honour of Vancouver's centennial anniversary.

Kits sports
In addition to its distinguished academic record, Kitsilano has been highly successful in a number of sports, most prominently, basketball, rugby, soccer, ice-hockey, and cheer. It won provincial basketball championships in 1997, were the City and District Champions and went to the Provincial finals in 1977, and more recently the HSBC Vancouver basketball tournament in 2007. In addition, the Kits cheerleading team went to the world championships held at the ESPN World Wide Sports Centre in Florida in 2017 and 2018.

Concluding the 2020-2021 school year, the Kitsilano Athletics department shifted away from the "Blue Demon" name and logo toward a culturally appropriate new name and logo.

History and facilities
Kitsilano Secondary School was founded in 1917, when overflow classes from King Edward High School were moved to Cecil Rhodes School.  The first temporary wooden structures for the new school were built in 1920 at Trafalgar and 12th Avenue. The current building was designed by Vancouver VSB staff architect Frank A.A. Barrs and opened in 1927.  In 1958, a Modernist-style addition designed by school architect Allan B. Wilson was added to the south side of the original building.  In 1973 a single storey concrete structure was added on the southeast corner of the site.

In 2010 the school board approved a concept plan for the seismic upgrades to the facility.  In October 2011 the provincial government announced a $57.8 million restoration project that will include seismic upgrades and new construction meeting Leadership in Energy and Environmental Design (LEED) Gold Standards.  In 2012 three design-build partners, each comprising a general contractor and an architectural firm, were shortlisted for the project.  In August 2013 it was announced that the Bouygues Building Canada team were selected to design and build the renovation and expansion.

Construction began on the south east corner in 2014. This involved the removal of the tennis and volleyball courts. The new academic wing was completed in the summer of 2015 and the school's renovations were finished by fall 2017.

Incidents
On April 5, 2013 students, parents and staff were informed that an incident involving two students and a staff member may have occurred during a school trip two years earlier. The teacher involved was placed on paid leave. Neither the Vancouver School Board or Vancouver Police Department will discuss the specifics of the allegations. No charges have ever been filed.

On January 31, 2018 a groping incident between students occurred at a school dance. The incident was under investigation as of February 3, 2018 according to a Vancouver School Board spokesman. Parents were also informed by administration about the incident.

Notable alumni

Kathleen Heddle, Olympic rower, 3-time Gold medallist
Josh Holmes, Video game designer
Joshua Jackson, actor
Levon Kendall, professional basketball player
Boris Malagurski, film director, producer, writer, political commentator, and television host
Justin Mensah-Coker, professional rugby player, currently playing with Plymouth Albion R.F.C. (UK)
Ryan Reynolds, television/movie star
Sarah Strange, television/movie actor

References

External links
 School history webpage
 Kitsilano SS renewal project
 Kitsilano SS renewal project schedule 
 Canada's Historic Places, Kitsilano Secondary School webpage
 Kitsilano Secondary School Alumni Association

1918 establishments in British Columbia
Educational institutions established in 1918
French-language schools in British Columbia
High schools in Vancouver